Diapontia is a genus of spiders in the family Lycosidae. It was first described in 1877 by Keyserling.

Species 
 it contains nine species:

 Diapontia anfibia (Zapfe-Mann, 1979) — Chile, Argentina
 Diapontia arapensis (Strand, 1908) — Peru
 Diapontia calama Piacentini, Scioscia, Carbajal, Ott, Brescovit & Ramírez, 2017 — Chile
 Diapontia chamberlini Piacentini, Scioscia, Carbajal, Ott, Brescovit & Ramírez, 2017 — Peru
 Diapontia niveovittata Mello-Leitão, 1945 — Brazil, Paraguay, Argentina
 Diapontia oxapampa Piacentini, Scioscia, Carbajal, Ott, Brescovit & Ramírez, 2017 — Peru
 Diapontia securifera (Tullgren, 1905) — Argentina, Chile
 Diapontia songotal Piacentini, Scioscia, Carbajal, Ott, Brescovit & Ramírez, 2017 — Bolivia
 Diapontia uruguayensis Keyserling, 1877 — Brazil, Paraguay, Uruguay, Argentina, Chile

References

Lycosidae
Araneomorphae genera
Spiders of South America
Taxa named by Eugen von Keyserling